Nikolaos Xydias Typaldos (Greek: Νικόλαος Ξυδιάς Τυπάλδος; 1826/29, Lixouri – 1909, Athens) was a Greek painter, best known for his portraits. He worked mostly in the Academic style.

Biography
His first studies were in Italy, followed by some time at the École des Beaux-Arts in Paris, where he held several exhibitions to good critical response. Although initially influenced by the Heptanese School of painting, his time in France opened him up to modern trends. The work of Manet was a major influence. 

He continued to live in Paris for many years, but spent much of his career travelling, spending time in London, Italy and Saint Petersburg. In 1890, he returned to Greece and won a gold medal at an exhibition in Parnassos.

In addition to his portraits, he also created still-lifes and genre paintings, as well as scenes from history and mythology, which are considered to be Pre-Impressionist.

References

Further reading
Marinos Kalligas, Ζωγραφική, γλυπτική, χαρακτική, Ιστορία του Ελληνικού Έθνους (Painting, sculpture, printmaking, History of the Greek Nation), Athens Publishing, 1977, pgs. 536-537

External links 

Arcadja Auctions: More works by Xydias Typaldos

1826 births
1909 deaths
People from Paliki
Portrait painters
19th-century Greek painters